Michael Wallace (born 5 October 1970) is an English former professional footballer who played in the Football League for Stockport County. Wallace was sent-off in the 1994 Football League Second Division play-off Final against Burnley for spitting at Ted McMinn.

References

1970 births
Living people
English footballers
Association football defenders
English Football League players
People from Farnworth
Manchester City F.C. players
Stockport County F.C. players
Witton Albion F.C. players
Kendal Town F.C. players
Leigh Genesis F.C. players